The title Baron Mordaunt was created in 1529 for Sir John Mordaunt. The fifth baron was created Earl of Peterborough in 1628 and the title then passed to his son, the second earl, in 1644. On his death in 1697, the earldom was inherited by his nephew, Charles and the barony was inherited by his only child, Mary, the estranged wife of the 7th Duke of Norfolk. When she died childless in 1705, the barony was also inherited by Charles, who had also been created Earl of Monmouth. On the death of the 5th Earl of Peterborough in 1814, the title passed to his elder half-sister, Mary. When she died childless in 1819, the title then passed to the 4th Duke of Gordon, who was a maternal great-grandson of the 3rd Earl of Peterborough. The title was then inherited by the 5th Duke of Gordon in 1827 and when he died without legitimate issue in 1836, the title became abeyant between his sisters (Charlotte Lennox, Duchess of Richmond; Susan Montagu, Duchess of Manchester; Georgiana Russell, Duchess of Bedford; Louisa Cornwallis, Marchioness Cornwallis; and Lady Madeline Palmer) and their issue.

Barons Mordaunt (1529)
John Mordaunt, 1st Baron Mordaunt (d. 1562)
John Mordaunt, 2nd Baron Mordaunt (1508–1571)
Lewis Mordaunt, 3rd Baron Mordaunt (1538–1601)
Henry Mordaunt, 4th Baron Mordaunt (c. 1567–1609)
John Mordaunt, 1st Earl of Peterborough, 5th Baron Mordaunt (1599–1644)
Henry Mordaunt, 2nd Earl of Peterborough, 6th Baron Mordaunt (1621–1697)
Mary Howard, 7th Baroness Mordaunt, Duchess of Norfolk (c. 1659–1705)
Charles Mordaunt, 3rd Earl of Peterborough, 1st Earl of Monmouth, 8th Baron Mordaunt (c. 1658–1735)
Charles Mordaunt, 4th Earl of Peterborough, 2nd Earl of Monmouth, 9th Baron Mordaunt (1708–1779)
Charles Mordaunt, 5th Earl of Peterborough, 3rd Earl of Monmouth, 10th Baron Mordaunt (1758–1814)
Mary Mordaunt, 11th Baroness Mordaunt (1738–1819)
Alexander Gordon, 4th Duke of Gordon, 12th Baron Mordaunt (1743–1827)
George Gordon, 5th Duke of Gordon, 13th Baron Mordaunt (1770–1836) (abeyant)

Co-heirs
Charles Gordon-Lennox, 11th Duke of Richmond
Jean Stewart of Banchory-Devenick and Leggart
Olive Iona Rachel O'Reilly
Alexander Montagu, 13th Duke of Manchester
Antony Geoffrey Strutt
Alexandra Louise Rubens
Alexander Russell (son of Sir John Wriothesley Russell and Aliki Diplarakou)

1529 establishments in England
Abeyant baronies in the Peerage of England
Noble titles created in 1529